Valkenburg Castle is a ruined castle in Valkenburg aan de Geul, Netherlands. It is unique in the Netherlands in that it is the only castle in the country built on a hill. The castle is listed in the top hundred of Dutch cultural monuments.

History

In the year 1115, fortifications were erected at the site by Gosewijn I, Lord of Valkenburg. This original wooden keep survived until 1122 when it was destroyed under siege by Henry V, Holy Roman Emperor. The castle was rebuilt in the following centuries but was again destroyed in a siege, this time by John III, Duke of Brabant. The current ruins are those of the castle rebuilt in the 14th century.

The castle suffered heavily in the Dutch Spanish war as it wasn't built to withstand the new heavy duty cannons and mortars. The Spanish armies severely crippled the defensive walls of Valkenburg and left the castle in a far state of disrepair with its magnificent towers now collapsed and its roofs burned to ashes. The Dutch armies attempted to repair the castle but were unsuccessful due to the ongoing wars with the Spaniards and the French.

The castle was slighted during the Franco-Dutch War, in 1672, by the army of King-Stadtholder Willem III to prevent it falling into French hands.

See also

List of castles in the Netherlands

References 
Kransber, D. & H. Mils, Kastelengids van Nederland, middeleeuwen, Bussem 1979
Kalkwiek, K.A., A.I.J.M. Schellart, H.P.H. Jansen & P.W. Geudeke, Atlas van de Nederlandse kastelen, Alphen aan den Rijn 1980
Helsdingen, H.W. van, Gids voor de Nederlandse kastelen en buitenplaatsen, Amsterdam 1966
Tromp, H.M.J., Kijk op kastelen Amsterdam 1979

External links 

Mot's Castle page of castles in the Netherlands

Ruined castles in the Netherlands
Castles in South Limburg (Netherlands)
Rijksmonuments in Valkenburg aan de Geul